John H. Stringfellow (November 14, 1819 – July 24, 1905) was an early physician of Kansas, one of the founders of Atchison, and speaker of the house in the first territorial legislature, the pro-slavery Bogus Legislature. He was born in Culpeper County, Virginia, son of Robert Stringfellow, a farmer, veteran of the War of 1812, merchant at Raccoon Ford on the Rapidan River, and Mary Plunkett, daughter of an early industrialist in Orange County, Virginia. Benjamin Franklin Stringfellow was his younger brother. He was educated at Caroline Academy, Va., Columbia University, and graduated from the medical department of the University of Pennsylvania in 1845. Soon after that he located at Carrollton, Missouri, where he married Ophelia J. Simmons, niece of Louisiana Governor John Bel Edwards.

During the cholera epidemic of 1849, when every boat coming up the river unloaded cholera patients, he converted a large warehouse into a hospital and devoted three months to caring for them. In 1852 he removed to Platte City. Upon the organization of Kansas Territory in 1854 he crossed the Missouri River, selected a claim, and in connection with some friends formed a town company which laid out the town of Atchison. In 1854 he brought his family and lived in Atchison until 1858. He was the founder and editor of the pro-slavery Squatter Sovereign, the first newspaper in Atchison, and was commissioned colonel of the Third regiment of the territorial militia by Gov. Shannon. He was called to Virginia by the death of his father in 1858 and was detained there until after the opening of the Civil War. He entered the Confederate service as captain of a Virginia company, but was at once detailed as surgeon and acted in that capacity only. In 1871 he returned to Atchison and remained there until 1876. He then moved to St. Joseph, Missouri, where he died on July 24, 1905.

See also
 Bleeding Kansas
 Border ruffians

References

People from Atchison, Kansas
Physicians from Kansas
Kansas Territory
American proslavery activists
19th-century American newspaper editors
Perelman School of Medicine at the University of Pennsylvania alumni
People from St. Joseph, Missouri
People from Carrollton, Missouri
People from Culpeper County, Virginia
Confederate States Army officers
Bleeding Kansas
American white supremacists
1819 births
1905 deaths
Editors of Kansas newspapers